The following is a list of convenience stores or convenience shops organized by geographical location, and by the country where the headquarters are located.

Multinational chains

Convenience stores by country

Africa

Nigeria
 Westgate superstores
 Shop-Rite 
 De-prince
 Bestchoice Superstores

Kenya
National Oil

Morocco
Mini-Brahim

Asia

China
7-Eleven
Alldays
Bianlifeng
Bilibee
C&U
Circle K
C-Store
Easy Joy – located at Sinopec gas stations
FamilyMart
Fook
Happy Mart
Hongqi
Lawson
Meiyijia
Ministop
OurHours
Suning
Tangjiu
Tianfu
Today
uSmile – located at PetroChina gas stations
VanGO
WOWO
Wumart

Hong Kong
Circle K
Ministop
PARKnSHOP Express
7-Eleven
VanGO

India
Big Bazaar
24 SEVEN
LuLu Group International
Spencer's
Hypercity
Reliance Fresh
Spar
More
DMart
Easyday
7-Eleven
The New Shop
SuperK

Indonesia
212 Mart
Alfamart
Ceriamart
Circle K
FamilyMart
Indomaret
Lawson
Yomart

Japan

7 & I (7-Eleven)
Lawson
FamilyMart
Circle K Sunkus
Ministop
Daily Yamazaki
Poplar

Malaysia
7-Eleven
MyNews
Circle K
KR1M (owned by Mydin)
MyMart
CU

Mongolia
CU (more than 120 stores)
GS25

Pakistan
Carrefour (JV with MAF under the name of "Hyper Star")
WBM International Online
Imtiaz Mega
Green Valley (convenience store)
Metro Cash and Carry

Philippines
7-Eleven
Circle K
FamilyMart
Lawson
Alfamart
Uncle John's

Singapore

Cheers- owned by NTUC FairPrice

South Korea
7-Eleven
CU
emart24
GS25
ministop
cspace

Taiwan
7-Eleven
FamilyMart

Thailand
7-Eleven
Lotus's Go Fresh
FamilyMart
Fresh Mart (700+ shops)
Mini Big C (396 shops as of 2016)
108 Shop Mini Outlet (now operates or services over 250 shops)
Jiffy
Lawson 108
Tops Daily

Vietnam
Circle K
FamilyMart
GS25
Ministop
7-Eleven
Defunct:
ampm (ended business in 1998)
Shop&Go (ended business in 2019)

Europe
Listed by country where headquartered:

Finland
R-kioski owned by Reitangruppen
Sale, Alepa, owned by the S Group
K-market, owned by Kesko

France
8 à Huit
Carrefour City – France

Hungary
CBA
COOP

Ireland
Centra – Ireland and Northern Ireland, owned by the Musgrave Group

Luxembourg
Cactus Shoppy – owned by the Cactus Group

Malta
tal-kantuniera Birkirkara – 
tal-kantuniera Gzira –

Netherlands
Albert Heijn To Go – owned by Stationsfoodstore, a franchiser of Albert Heijn (in addition to normal Albert Heijn supermarkets elsewhere)
Jumbo City - can be found within city centers and some train stations. 
SPAR (EuroSpar, SuperSpar) – large chain throughout Europe
Wizzl of Servex – Netherlands, train stations, also selling train tickets (typically at small stations which have no separate ticket window or counter)

Norway
7-Eleven
Coop Mega – owned by Coop Norge
Coop Prix – owned by Coop Norge
Bunnpris – owned by I.K. Lykke
Deli de Luca – Norway – owned by Norgesgruppen
Extra – owned by Coop Norge
Kiwi – owned by Norgesgruppene
Narvesen – operates in Norway, Latvia, and Lithuania – owned by Reitan Group
Meny – operates in Norway and Denmark – owned by Norgesgruppen
Pressbyrån – operates in Sweden – owned by Reitan Group
Rema 1000 – bought Lidl Norge – operates in Norway, Denmark and Sweden – owned by Reitan Group
R-kioski – operates in Finland and Estonia – bought by Reitan Group in 2012

Poland
Freshmarket
Groszek
Małpka Express
Piotr i Paweł
Polomarket
Społem
Żabka – operates in Eastern Europe; the Czech Republic division was sold to Tesco in 2010

Russia
Dixy
Magnit
Pyaterochka

Spain
DIA
 Hipercor and Supercor – owned by El Corte Inglés
Mercadona

Switzerland
Coop
Denner
Migros

Turkey
Ekomini – operates in Turkey – owned by Anadolu Group

United Kingdom

Best-One – supplied by Bestway
Budgens – owned by Booker Retail Partners GB
Co-op Food
Costcutter
David Sands
Happy Shopper – Supplied by Booker Cash & Carry which, in turn, is owned by Tesco plc.
Kwik Save – bought by Costcutter in 2012
L&F Jones
Little Waitrose – convenience shop format for John Lewis' Waitrose Supermarkets
Londis – owned by Booker Retail Partners GB
M Local – convenience shop format for Morrisons Supermarkets
Mace – convenience shop format for Palmer & Harvey wholesale
McColl's – trades under the Martin, McColls and RS McColl
Morning, Noon & Night – Scotland
Nisa – private limited company and retailers' co-operative
One Stop – owned by Tesco plc
Premier Stores – Supplied by Booker Cash & Carry which, in turn, is owned by Tesco plc.
Sainsbury's Local – including Sainsbury's at Bells, convenience shop format for Sainsbury's supermarkets
Tesco Express – convenience shop format for Tesco, a supermarket chain
WHSmith

North America
Listed by country or country subdivision:

Canada
Aisle 24
Avondale Stores
Becker's
Circle K
Couche-Tard/Provi-Soir
Hasty Market
Irving Blue Canoe / Irving Mainway
Marie's Mini Mart (Newfoundland and Labrador)
Needs Convenience
OLCO
On the Run, at Exxon and Mobil stations in the US; Esso and Mobil stations internationally, owned by Couche-Tard
Orangestore (Newfoundland and Labrador) – convenience shop format for North Atlantic gas stations.
Pioneer
Quickie Convenience Stores
Sprint

Mexico
Farmacias Guadalajara
OXXO
Super City – owned by Soriana
Tiendas Extra
Kiosko

United States
Stores are listed by the location of their corporate headquarters. Most of these operate in multiple states:

Arizona
Circle K (Tempe)

Arkansas
Superstop (North Little Rock, Arkansas) – Owned by Coulson Oil Company; sells fuel under the Shell Oil Company, Valero, and Phillips 66 brands along with unbranded fuel
Road Runner (North Little Rock, Arkansas)- Purchased by Coulson Oil Company from Truman Arnold Companies; sells fuel under the Shell and Valero brands
Flash Markets (West Memphis, Arkansas) Sells fuel under the Citgo and Shell brands
Jordans Kwik Stop (Harrisburg, Arkansas) Sells fuel under the Citgo, Shell, Valero, Exxon, and Phillips 66 brands
Murphy USA/Murphy Express (El Dorado, Arkansas)
 Satterfield Stores (Conway, Arkansas) Sells fuel under the Gulf brand

California
ampm (La Palma) – located at ARCO gas stations
ExtraMile (San Ramon) – at Chevron gas stations
Fastrip (Bakersfield)
Sierra Energy Express (Roseville)
United Pacific/We Got It! (Gardena)

Colorado
Loaf 'N Jug (Pueblo) – a division of EG Group
Alta Convenience (Denver)
Connecticut
Sams Food Stores (Rocky Hill)

Florida
Gate Petroleum (Jacksonville)

Georgia
RaceTrac (Atlanta)
Stuckey's (Eastman)

Hawaii
ABC Stores (Honolulu)
Aloha Island Mart (Honolulu) – owned by Aloha Petroleum
nomnom (Honolulu) – owned by Par Hawaii, a subsidiary of Par Pacific Holdings
Sullivan Family of Companies (Honolulu) – owns several chains in Hawaii

Idaho
Albertsons Express (Boise)
Fast Eddy's (Meridian)
Jacksons (Boise)
Roady's Truck Stops (New Plymouth)
Stinker Stores (Boise) – Family owned company that operates in Idaho, Colorado & Wyoming selling Sinclair fuel

Illinois
Fast N Fresh Stores (Gardner)
Huck's Food & Fuel (Carmi)
Jewel Express (Itasca)
Road Ranger (Rockford)
MotoMart (Belleville)

Indiana
Martin's Fuel Centers (South Bend)
Buddy's Mart (Kokomo)

Iowa
Casey's General Stores (Ankeny) – concentrated in the Midwestern US, primarily in Iowa, Illinois, Minnesota, and Missouri
Kum & Go (Hampton) – operates in the Midwestern US

Kansas
Kwik Shop (Hutchinson) – a division of EG Group

Kentucky
Minit Mart (Bowling Green)
Thorntons (Louisville)
Tiger Mart (owned by ExxonMobil)
FiveStar Food Mart (owned by Newcomb Oil Co., LLC) (Bardstown)

Louisiana
Shop Rite (Crowley)

Maryland
Dash In (La Plata)
High's Dairy Store (Hanover)
Royal Farms (Baltimore)

Massachusetts
Alltown Fresh (Waltham)
Cumberland Farms (Framingham) – locations throughout New England
Pride Stores (Springfield, MA) – locations in Western Massachusetts and Connecticut
Tedeschi Food Shops (Rockland) – also Lil Peach and Store 24; locations throughout Massachusetts and southern New Hampshire

Michigan
EZ-Mart (Bear Lake)
Meijer (Grand Rapids) – located at Meijer hypermarkets, with a few standalone convenience stores in Michigan
Quality Dairy (Lansing)

Minnesota
Cenex (Inver Grove Heights) – owned by CHS Inc.
Holiday Stationstores (Bloomington)
SuperAmerica (Woodbury) Now operated by Speedway – aka SA; operates in the Midwestern United States

Mississippi
Jr. Food Mart (Flowood)
Sprint Mart (Ridgeland) – convenience stores and truck stops in Mississippi and Alabama

Missouri
Break Time (Columbia) – owned by MFA Oil

Montana
Town Pump (Butte) – operates truck stops with casinos in Montana

Nevada
Terrible Herbst (Las Vegas)

New Jersey
QuickChek (Whitehouse Station)

New Mexico
Allsup's (Clovis)
Brewer Oil (Albuquerque)

New York
Byrne Dairy (Syracuse)
Dairy Barn (East Northport)
NOCO Express (Tonawanda)
Stewart's Shops (Saratoga Springs)
Bolla Market (Garden City)
Mirabito (Binghamton)

North Carolina
The Pantry (Cary) – operating under various names in the southeastern United States – Acquired by Circle K
Kangaroo Express – formerly Petro Express, now owned by Circle K
VPS Convenience (Wilmington)

Ohio
BellStores (Massillon)
Convenient Food Mart (Mentor)
Monnettes' Market (Toledo)
Speedway (Enon) – owned by Marathon Petroleum; also operates many former Hess stores
TravelCenters of America (Westlake)
TrueNorth (Brecksville)
United Dairy Farmers (Cincinnati) – operates in the Cincinnati metropolitan area (Ohio, Kentucky, Indiana) plus other Ohio locations

Oklahoma
Love's Travel Stops & Country Stores (Oklahoma City) – operates truck stops
OnCue Express (Stillwater) – found throughout the state of Oklahoma
QuikTrip (Tulsa) – primarily found in the Midwestern and Southern United States

Oregon
Dari Mart (Junction City)
Plaid Pantry (Beaverton) – operates locations in Oregon and Washington

Pennsylvania
Dandy Mini Marts (Twin Tiers) – locations through the northern tier of Pennsylvania and southern tier of New York.
A-Plus (Philadelphia) – located at Sunoco gas stations
Acme Express (Malvern) – Greater Philadelphia
GetGo (Pittsburgh) – locations throughout western Pennsylvania, western Maryland, northern West Virginia, Ohio, and Indiana, a division of Giant Eagle
Kwik Fill / Red Apple / Country Fair (Warren) – locations throughout central and western Pennsylvania, eastern Ohio, and western New York
Mini Mart (Lewistown) – locations throughout the Lewistown, State College, and Williamsport areas of Pennsylvania
Rutter's (York) – locations throughout central and eastern Pennsylvania
Sheetz (Altoona) – locations throughout Pennsylvania, Ohio, West Virginia, Maryland, Virginia, and North Carolina
Tom's Convenience Store (York) – locations throughout central Pennsylvania 
Turkey Hill Minit Markets (Lancaster) – locations throughout central and eastern Pennsylvania, central Ohio, and central Indiana. 
Wawa (Wawa) – locations throughout eastern Pennsylvania, New Jersey, Delaware, eastern Maryland, eastern Virginia, and Florida

South Carolina
Spinx (Greenville)

Tennessee
MAPCO Express (Brentwood) – a subsidiary of Empresas Copec, a Chilean oil company
Pilot Flying J (Knoxville)
Pilot Food Mart (Knoxville)
Weigel's (Powell)

Texas
7-Eleven (Dallas)
AAFES (Dallas) – located on military bases
Buc-ee's (Lake Jackson)
Corner Store (San Antonio)
Exxon (Irving)
E-Z Mart (Texarkana, Texas)
Stripes Convenience Stores (Corpus Christi)
Toot N' Totum (Amarillo)

Utah
Maverik (Salt Lake City)

Vermont
Champlain Farms – locations throughout Vermont
Jiffy Mart (Perkinsville) – locations throughout Vermont and western New Hampshire
Jolley Associates (Saint Albans) – locations throughout Vermont, eastern New York, and western New Hampshire
Maplefields – locations throughout Vermont and eastern New York

Virginia
Erica Mall (Mount Holly)
Fas Mart/Shore Stop (Richmond)
Farm Fresh Express (Virginia Beach)
5 Twelve Manassas, Virginia

West Virginia
Go-Mart – chain with locations in West Virginia, Virginia, Kentucky, and Ohio

Wisconsin
Kwik Trip / Kwik Star (La Crosse) – Kwik Trip in Wisconsin and Minnesota, and Kwik Star in Iowa
PDQ Food Stores (Middleton) – operates locations in Minnesota, Wisconsin, and California

Oceania

Australia
As of 2021, there are over 8,000 individual convenience stores operating in Australia. The most common brands and franchises include:

7-Eleven
Ampol
City Convenience Store
Coles Express
EzyMart
IGA X-press
NewsLink
NightOwl Convenience Stores
On the Run
SPAR

South America

Brazil 

In Brazil, most convenience stores are installed at gas stations, there are over 8,100 stores operating at service stations. In 2019, there are over 3,100 individuals convenience stores operating in the country. The most common chains and franchises include:

 Aghora
 ampm
 BR Mania
 Carrefour Express
 Extrafarma
 Hirota Food Express
 Local Americanas
 Mini Extra
 Minuto Pão de Açúcar
 OXXO
 Shell Select

Former
Daily Stop – based in Hong Kong, merged into 7-Eleven in 2004
Hess – based in New York City; sold its gas station/convenience store network to Marathon Petroleum in 2014
Jacksons Stores – became Sainsbury's at Jacksons in 2004; replaced with the Sainsbury's Local brand in 2008
Local Plus – based in the UK, bought by the Co-operative Group in 2004
Mac's – based in Canada, rebranded as Circle K in 2017
Mills – based in the UK, sold to Tesco in 2010
 Pak-A-Sak-based in (Shreveport, Louisiana); sold to 7-Eleven in 1970
Somerfield – bought by the Co-operative Group in 2009
Town & Country Food Stores – bought by Stripes Convenience Stores in 2007
Ugo – bought by Poundstretcher in 2012
Uni-Mart – based in Pennsylvania, bought by Kwik Pik in 2009
UtoteM – operated until 1984 in Southwestern United States
White Hen Pantry – based in Illinois, acquired by 7-Eleven in 2006

See also
List of department stores
List of hypermarkets
List of superstores

References

https://mymotomart.com/

Convenience stores
Convenience stores